The 2010–11 Atlanta Thrashers season was the team's 12th season of operation in the National Hockey League (NHL). The Thrashers posted a regular season record of 34 wins, 36 losses and 12 overtime/shootout losses for 80 points, failing to qualify for the Stanley Cup playoffs for the fourth consecutive season. It was the last season for the franchise in Atlanta. It was announced on May 31, 2011 that the team was bought and would be relocated  to Winnipeg, for the 2011–12 NHL season to become the new Winnipeg Jets.

Off-season 
During the off-season, the Thrashers announced that they would not retain John Anderson as head coach. The team also promoted Don Waddell to president and Rick Dudley to general manager. Assistant coaches Randy Cunneyworth, Todd Nelson and Steve Weeks were also not retained.

Dudley made his first trade as general manager on June 23, 2010. It was a major trade, a nine-player trade (including picks) with the Chicago Blackhawks. The Thrashers received Dustin Byfuglien, Ben Eager, Brent Sopel and Akim Aliu for Marty Reasoner, Joey Crabb, Jeremy Morin, the Devils' first-round pick (#24 overall) in 2010 and the Devils' second-round pick (#54 overall) in 2010. The Blackhawks, Stanley Cup champions, found it necessary to trade players for prospects and picks as they were in difficulty with the salary cap.

On June 24, the team named Craig Ramsay as the new head coach. Ramsay, who had been an assistant coach for the Boston Bruins for the previous three seasons, had played with Dudley with the Buffalo Sabres during his playing career. In the following weeks, the Thrashers hired an associate coach, John Torchetti, and an assistant coach, Mike Stothers. The team also hired Clint Malarchuk as the team's goaltending consultant.

Regular season

Divisional standings

Conference standings

Playoffs 
The Thrashers failed to make the playoffs and have not made the playoffs since 2006–07 season.

Schedule and results

Pre-season 

|- align="center" bgcolor="#FFBBBB"
| 1 || September 21 || Columbus Blue Jackets || 2-5 || ||Pavelec|| Philips Arena ||5,725 ||0-1-0
|- align="center" bgcolor="#FFBBBB"
| 2 || September 25 || Carolina Hurricanes || 0-1 || ||Mason ||Philips Arena ||6,701 ||0-2-0
|- align="center" bgcolor="#FFBBBB"
| 3 || September 27 || Nashville Predators || 1-2 || || Pavelec ||Bridgestone Arena ||10,411 ||0-3-0
|- align="center" bgcolor="#FFBBBB"
| 4 || September 29 || Nashville Predators || 3-4 || || Mason||Philips Arena ||6,076 ||0-4-0
|- align="center" bgcolor="#BBBBBB"
| 5 || October 1 || Carolina Hurricanes || 1-2 || OT ||Pavlec || RBC Center||15,787 ||0-4-1
|- align="center" bgcolor="#FFBBBB"
| 6 || October 2 || Columbus Blue Jackets || 3-4 || ||Mason|| Nationwide Arena||11,961 ||0-5-1
|-

Regular season 

|- align="center" bgcolor="#CCFFCC"
| 1|| October 8|| Washington Capitals ||4-2 || E. Kane|| C. Mason || Philips Arena||15,596 ||1-0-0 ||2
|- align="center" bgcolor="#FFBBBB"
| 2||October 9|| Tampa Bay Lightning ||3-5 ||S. Stamkos || C. Mason || St. Pete Times Forum||19,791 || 1-1-0||2
|- align="center" bgcolor="#FFBBBB"
| 3||October 12 || Los Angeles Kings ||1-3 ||J. Quick || C. Mason ||Staples Center ||18,118 ||1-2-0 || 2
|- align="center" bgcolor="#CCFFCC"
| 4|| October 15|| Anaheim Ducks || 5-4SO ||A. Stewart || C. Mason|| Honda Center||13,123 || 2-2-0|| 4
|- align="center" bgcolor="#CCFFCC"
| 5|| October 16|| San Jose Sharks || 4-2 ||C. Mason || C. Mason||HP Pavilion ||17,562 ||3-2-0 || 6
|- align="center" bgcolor="#FFBBBB"
| 6||October 20|| Buffalo Sabres || 1-4 || T. Myers|| C. Mason ||Philips Arena ||8,820 ||3-3-0 || 6
|- align="center" bgcolor="#FFBBBB"
| 7||October 22 || Tampa Bay Lightning || 2-5 ||S. Stamkos || C. Mason ||Philips Arena ||9,138 || 3-4-0|| 6
|- align="center" bgcolor="#BBBBBB"
| 8||October 23 ||Washington Capitals || 3-4OT || A. Semin|| C. Mason ||Verizon Center || 18,398|| 3-4-1|| 7
|- align="center" bgcolor="#CCFFCC"
| 9|| October 27|| New York Rangers || 6-4 || N. Bergfors|| C. Mason || Madison Square Garden ||17,900 ||4-4-1 || 9
|- align="center" bgcolor="#CCFFCC"
| 10|| October 29|| Buffalo Sabres || 4-3OT || D. Byfuglien|| C. Mason || Philips Arena||10,172 ||5-4-1 || 11
|- align="center" bgcolor="#BBBBBB"
| 11|| October 30|| St. Louis Blues ||3-4SO ||J. McClement || O. Pavelec ||Scottrade Center ||19,150 ||5-4-2 ||12
|-

|- align="center" bgcolor="#CCFFCC"
| 12|| November 3|| Florida Panthers || 4-3 ||C. Mason || C. Mason || BankAtlantic Center || 11,212|| 6-4-2||14
|- align="center" bgcolor="#FFBBBB"
|13 || November 4|| Columbus Blue Jackets ||0-3 ||M. Garon || O. Pavelec ||Philips Arena || 8,461 ||6-5-2 || 14
|- align="center" bgcolor="#BBBBBB"
| 14|| November 6|| Chicago Blackhawks || 4-5SO || J. Toews || O. Pavelec ||Philips Arena || 16,022 || 6-5-3|| 15
|- align="center" bgcolor="#FFBBBB"
| 15|| November 9|| Ottawa Senators || 2-5 ||J. Spezza || C. Mason ||Scotiabank Place ||16,583 || 6-6-3|| 15
|- align="center" bgcolor="#CCFFCC"
| 16|| November 11|| Minnesota Wild ||5-1 ||O. Pavelec || O. Pavelec ||Philips Arena ||10,055 ||7-6-3 || 17
|- align="center" bgcolor="#FFBBBB"
| 17|| November 13|| Pittsburgh Penguins || 2-4 ||E. Malkin || O. Pavelec ||Philips Arena || 16,710 ||7-7-3 || 17
|- align="center" bgcolor="#FFBBBB"
| 18|| November 14|| Washington Capitals || 4-6 ||J. Erskine || O. Pavelec ||Verizon Center || 18,398||7-8-3 || 17
|- align="center" bgcolor="#FFBBBB"
| 19|| November 17|| Florida Panthers || 1-2 ||T. Vokoun || O. Pavelec ||Philips Arena || 10,168||7-9-3 || 17
|- align="center" bgcolor="#CCFFCC"
| 20|| November 19|| Washington Capitals || 5-0 ||O. Pavelec || O. Pavelec ||Philips Arena ||11,115 || 8-9-3|| 19
|- align="center" bgcolor="#CCFFCC"
| 21|| November 21|| New York Islanders || 2-1OT || D. Byfuglien || O. Pavelec ||Philips Arena ||10,066 || 9-9-3|| 21
|- align="center" bgcolor="#CCFFCC"
| 22|| November 24|| Detroit Red Wings || 5-1 ||B. Little || O. Pavelec ||Philips Arena ||15,337 ||10-9-3 || 23
|- align="center" bgcolor="#CCFFCC"
| 23|| November 26|| Montreal Canadiens || 3-0 ||O. Pavelec || O. Pavelec ||Philips Arena ||13,068 || 11-9-3|| 25
|- align="center" bgcolor="#CCFFCC"
| 24|| November 28|| Boston Bruins || 4-1 || D. Byfuglien|| O. Pavelec || Philips Arena ||12,085 ||12-9-3 ||27
|- align="center" bgcolor="#CCFFCC"
| 25|| November 30|| Colorado Avalanche || 3-2OT || A. Stewart || O. Pavelec ||Pepsi Center ||12,131 ||13-9-3 ||29
|-

|- align="center" bgcolor="#FFBBBB"
| 26|| December 2|| Pittsburgh Penguins ||2-3 ||S. Crosby || O. Pavelec || Consol Energy Center ||18,223 || 13-10-3||29
|- align="center" bgcolor="#CCFFCC"
| 27|| December 4|| Washington Capitals || 3-1 ||O. Pavelec || O. Pavelec ||Verizon Center || 18,398|| 14-10-3|| 31
|- align="center" bgcolor="#CCFFCC"
| 28|| December 6|| Nashville Predators || 3-2OT ||Z. Bogosian || O. Pavelec ||Philips Arena ||10,024 || 15-10-3|| 33
|- align="center" bgcolor="#FFBBBB"
| 29|| December 10|| Colorado Avalanche ||2-4 || M. Duchene|| O. Pavelec ||Philips Arena ||14,034 ||15-11-3 || 33
|- align="center" bgcolor="#CCFFCC"
| 30|| December 11|| New York Islanders || 5-4 ||J. Oduya || C. Mason || Nassau Coliseum ||10,056 || 16-11-3||35
|- align="center" bgcolor="#CCFFCC"
| 31|| December 13|| Ottawa Senators || 4-3OT ||B. Little || O. Pavelec || Scotiabank Place||18,184 ||17-11-3 || 37
|- align="center" bgcolor="#BBBBBB"
| 32|| December 15|| Tampa Bay Lightning || 1-2SO ||S. Bergenheim || O. Pavelec ||St. Pete Times Forum || 14,441||17-11-4 || 38
|- align="center" bgcolor="#BBBBBB"
| 33|| December 16|| Carolina Hurricanes || 2-3SO ||S. Samsonov || C. Mason || Philips Arena ||11,043 ||17-11-5 || 39
|- align="center" bgcolor="#CCFFCC"
| 34|| December 18|| New Jersey Devils || 7-1 ||E. Boulton || O. Pavelec ||Philips Arena || 17,024||18-11-5 || 41
|- align="center" bgcolor="#CCFFCC"
| 35|| December 20|| Toronto Maple Leafs || 6-3 ||T. Enstrom || O. Pavelec ||Air Canada Centre ||19,301 || 19-11-5||43
|- align="center" bgcolor="#FFBBBB"
| 36|| December 21|| St. Louis Blues || 2-4||A. Steen || C. Mason ||Philips Arena ||14,662 || 19-12-5|| 43
|- align="center" bgcolor="#FFBBBB"
| 37|| December 23|| Boston Bruins || 1-4 ||S. Thornton || O. Pavelec ||TD Garden ||17,565 ||19-13-5 ||43
|- align="center" bgcolor="#BBBBBB"
| 38|| December 26|| Tampa Bay Lightning || 2-3OT ||V. Lecavalier || O. Pavelec||Philips Arena ||14,610 ||19-13-6 ||44
|- align="center" bgcolor="#FFBBBB"
| 39|| December 28|| Pittsburgh Penguins || 3-6 || S. Crosby|| O. Pavelec || Consol Energy Center|| 18,322||19-14-6 || 44
|- align="center" bgcolor="#CCFFCC"
| 40|| December 30|| Boston Bruins || 3-2SO ||T. Enstrom || O. Pavelec ||Philips Arena ||17,624 ||20-14-6 ||46
|- align="center" bgcolor="#FFBBBB"
| 41|| December 31|| New Jersey Devils || 1-3 ||J. Hedberg || C. Mason ||Prudential Center ||13,492 ||20-15-6 || 46
|-

|- align="center" bgcolor="#CCFFCC"
| 42|| January 2|| Montreal Canadiens || 4-3OT ||D. Byfuglien || O. Pavelec || Bell Centre ||21,273 ||21-15-6 || 48
|- align="center" bgcolor="#CCFFCC"
| 43|| January 5 || Florida Panthers || 3-2 ||R. Peverley || O. Pavelec || BankAtlantic Center|| 12,803 ||22-15-6 || 50
|- align="center" bgcolor="#FFBBBB"
| 44|| January 7 || Toronto Maple Leafs || 3-9 ||M. Grabovski || O. Pavelec ||Philips Arena || 14,592 ||22-16-6 || 50
|- align="center" bgcolor="#BBBBBB"
| 45|| January 9 || Carolina Hurricanes || 3-4OT ||T. Ruutu || O. Pavelec ||RBC Center ||17,907 ||22-16-7 || 51
|- align="center" bgcolor="#FFBBBB"
| 46|| January 14 || Philadelphia Flyers || 2-5 ||D. Briere || O. Pavelec ||Philips Arena || 15,081|| 22-17-7|| 51
|- align="center" bgcolor="#FFBBBB"
| 47|| January 15 || Dallas Stars || 1-6 ||T. Daley || O. Pavelec ||American Airlines Center||17,702 || 22-18-7|| 51
|- align="center" bgcolor="#CCFFCC"
| 48 || January 17 || Florida Panthers || 3-2SO || A. Burmistrov|| O. Pavelec ||BankAtlantic Center ||11,477 || 23-18-7|| 53
|- align="center" bgcolor="#BBBBBB"
| 49|| January 20 || Tampa Bay Lightning || 2-3SO ||S. Stamkos || O. Pavelec ||Philips Arena || 12,314 ||23-18-8 ||54
|- align="center" bgcolor="#BBBBBB"
| 50|| January 22 || New York Rangers || 2-3SO ||M. Zuccarello || O. Pavelec ||Philips Arena ||17,061 ||23-18-9 || 55
|- align="center" bgcolor="#FFBBBB"
| 51|| January 23 || Tampa Bay Lightning || 1-7 || S. Gagne || O. Pavelec ||St. Pete Times Forum || 13,916|| 23-19-9|| 55
|- align="center" bgcolor="#CCFFCC"
| 52|| January 26 || Washington Capitals || 1-0 ||O. Pavelec || O. Pavelec || Philips Arena || 14,513||24-19-9 || 57
|-

|- align="center" bgcolor="#FFBBBB"
| 53|| February 1|| New York Islanders || 1-4 ||K. Okposo || O. Pavelec ||Philips Arena || 11,176 ||24-20-9 || 57
|- align="center" bgcolor="#FFBBBB"
| 54|| February 3 || Calgary Flames || 2-4 ||M. Giordano || O. Pavelec ||Philips Arena || 12,984 || 24-21-9|| 57
|- align="center" bgcolor="#BBBBBB"
| 55|| February 5 || Carolina Hurricanes || 3-4OT || E. Cole || O. Pavelec ||RBC Center || 16,874 ||24-21-10 || 58
|- align="center" bgcolor="#FFBBBB"
| 56|| February 7 || Toronto Maple Leafs || 4-5 || T. Kaberle || O. Pavelec ||Air Canada Centre || 19,104 ||24-22-10 || 58
|- align="center" bgcolor="#CCFFCC"
| 57|| February 11 || New York Rangers || 3-2 ||E. Kane || O. Pavelec || Philips Arena|| 15,093||25-22-10 || 60
|- align="center" bgcolor="#FFBBBB"
| 58|| February 13 || Carolina Hurricanes || 2-3 || E. Cole|| O. Pavelec||Philips Arena || 13,032 ||25-23-10 || 60
|- align="center" bgcolor="#FFBBBB"
| 59|| February 17 || Phoenix Coyotes || 3-4 || L. Korpikoski || O. Pavelec ||Jobing.com Arena || 10,576|| 25-24-10|| 60
|- align="center" bgcolor="#FFBBBB"
| 60|| February 19|| Edmonton Oilers || 3-5 ||T. Hall || C. Mason ||Rexall Place ||16,839 || 25-25-10|| 60
|- align="center" bgcolor="#FFBBBB"
| 61|| February 23 || Buffalo Sabres || 1-4 || T. Myers || O. Pavelec || HSBC Arena || 18,690 ||25-26-10|| 60
|- align="center" bgcolor="#BBBBBB"
| 62|| February 25 || Florida Panthers || 1-2SO || S. Bernier|| C. Mason || Philips Arena|| 14,046||25-26-11 || 61
|- align="center" bgcolor="#CCFFCC"
| 63|| February 27 || Toronto Maple Leafs || 3-2OT || R. Hainsey || C. Mason || Philips Arena || 13,147 || 26-26-11 ||63
|-

|- align="center" bgcolor="#FFBBBB"
| 64|| March 1|| Montreal Canadiens || 1-3 || C. Price || C. Mason ||Philips Arena || 11,156 || 26-27-11 ||63
|- align="center" bgcolor="#FFBBBB"
| 65||March 3 || Ottawa Senators || 1-3 || B. Bulter || C. Mason ||Philips Arena || 10,461 || 26-28-11 ||63
|- align="center" bgcolor="#CCFFCC"
| 66|| March 5 || Florida Panthers || 4-3OT || A. Ladd || C. Mason ||Philips Arena || 15,799 || 27-28-11 || 65
|- align="center" bgcolor= "#CCFFCC"
| 67|| March 9 || Carolina Hurricanes || 3-2OT || O. Pavelec || O. Pavelec ||RBC Center || 16,126 || 28-28-11 || 67
|- align="center" bgcolor= "#BBBBBB"
| 68|| March 11 || New Jersey Devils || 2-3OT || T. Zajac || O. Pavelec ||Philips Arena || 16,073 || 28-28-12 || 68
|- align="center" bgcolor="#CCFFCC"
| 69|| March 12 || Philadelphia Flyers || 5-4OT || V. Leino || C. Mason ||Wells Fargo Center || 19,892 || 29-28-12 || 70
|- align="center" bgcolor="#FFBBBB"
| 70|| March 15 || New Jersey Devils || 2-4 || J. Josefson || O. Pavelec ||Prudential Center || 16,188 || 29-29-12 || 70
|- align="center" bgcolor="#CCFFCC"
| 71|| March 17 || Philadelphia Flyers || 4-3SO || R. Hainsey || O. Pavelec || Philips Arena || 16,502 || 30-29-12 || 72
|- align="center" bgcolor="#FFBBBB"
| 72|| March 19 || Buffalo Sabres || 2-8 || M. Mancari || O. Pavelec ||HSBC Arena || 18,690 || 30-30-12 || 72
|- align="center" bgcolor="#CCFFCC"
| 73|| March 24 || New York Islanders || 2-1 || B. Wheeler || C. Mason ||Nassau Coliseum || 11,874 || 31-30-12 || 74
|- align="center" bgcolor="#FFBBBB"
| 74|| March 25 || Vancouver Canucks || 1-3 || R. Luongo || C. Mason ||Philips Arena || 16,237 || 31-31-12 || 74
|- align="center" bgcolor="#CCFFCC"
| 75|| March 27 || Ottawa Senators || 5-4SO || B. Maxwell || C. Mason ||Philips Arena || 16,392 || 32-31-12 || 76
|- align="center" bgcolor="#FFBBBB"
| 76||March 29 || Montreal Canadiens || 1-3 || C. Price || O. Pavelec ||Bell Centre || 21,273 || 32-32-12 || 76
|- align="center" bgcolor="#CCFFCC"
| 77|| March 31 || Philadelphia Flyers || 1-0 || C. Mason || C. Mason || Wells Fargo Center|| 19,879 || 33-32-12 || 78
|-

|- align="center" bgcolor="#FFBBBB"
| 78|| April 2|| Boston Bruins || 2-3 || M. Ryder || O. Pavelec || TD Garden|| 17,565 || 33-33-12 || 78
|- align="center" bgcolor="#FFBBBB"
| 79|| April 5 || Nashville Predators || 3-6 || J. Tootoo || C. Mason ||Bridgestone Arena || 16,756 || 33-34-12 || 78
|- align="center" bgcolor="#CCFFCC"
| 80|| April 7 || New York Rangers || 3-0 || O. Pavelec || O. Pavelec ||Madison Square Garden || 18,200 || 34-34-12 || 80
|- align="center" bgcolor="#FFBBBB"
| 81|| April 8 || Carolina Hurricanes || 1-6 || J. Skinner || O. Pavelec || Philips Arena || 14,652 || 34-35-12 || 80
|- align="center" bgcolor="#FFBBBB"
| 82|| April 10 || Pittsburgh Penguins || 2-5 || B. Lovejoy || C. Mason ||Philips Arena || 16,085 || 34-36-12 || 80
|-

|-
| 2010–11 Schedule

Player statistics

Skaters

Goaltenders 
Note: GP = Games played; Min = Minutes played; W = Wins; L = Losses; OT = Overtime losses; GA = Goals against; GAA= Goals against average; SA= Shots against; SV= Saves; Sv% = Save percentage; SO= Shutouts

†Denotes player spent time with another team before joining Thrashers. Stats reflect time with the Thrashers only.
‡Traded mid-season
underline/italics denotes franchise record

Awards and records

Records

Milestones

Awards

Transactions 
The Thrashers have been involved in the following transactions during the 2010–11 season.

Trades 

|}

Notes

Free agents acquired

Free agents lost

Claimed via waivers

Lost via waivers

Lost via retirement

Player signings

Draft picks 
Atlanta's picks at the 2010 NHL Entry Draft in Los Angeles.

See also 
 2010–11 NHL season

References 

Atlanta Thrashers seasons
A
A
Atlanta Thrashers
Atlanta Thrashers